Rukmini Devi Arundale (née Shastri; 29 February 1904 – 24 February 1986) was an Indian theosophist, dancer and choreographer of the Indian classical dance form of Bharatanatyam, and an activist for animal welfare.

She was the first woman in Indian history to be nominated as a member of the Rajya Sabha, the upper house of the Parliament of India. The most important revivalist of Bharatanatyam from its original 'sadhir' style prevalent amongst the temple dancers, the Devadasis, she also worked for the re-establishment of traditional Indian arts and crafts.

She espoused the cause of Bharata Natyam which was considered a vulgar art. She 'sanitised' and removed the inherent eroticism of Sadhir to make it palatable to Indian upper-caste elites and the British morality of the era.

Rukmini Devi features in India Todays list of '100 People Who Shaped India'. She was awarded the Padma Bhushan in 1956, and the Sangeet Natak Akademi Fellowship in 1967.

Biography

Early life and marriage

Rukmini Devi was born in a brahmin family on 29 February 1904 in Madurai of Tamilnadu. Her father, Neelakanta Shastri, was an engineer with the Public Works Department and a scholar, and her mother Seshammal was a music enthusiast. He had a transferable job and the family moved frequently. He was introduced to the Theosophical Society in 1901. Her brother, Nilakanta Sri Ram, later became the President of the Theosophical Society. Deeply influenced by the Theosophical Movement as a follower of Dr Annie Besant, Neelakanta Shastri moved to Adyar, Chennai after retirement, where he built his home near the headquarters of the Theosophical Society Adyar. It was here that young Rukmini was exposed to not just theosophical thought, but also to new ideas on culture, theatre, music, and dance. Her meeting with the prominent British theosophist Dr George Arundale—a close associate of Annie Besant and later the principal of the Central Hindu College in Varanasi—led to her building a lasting bond with him.

They married in 1920 when she turned 16 and he was 26 years her senior at 42, much to the shock of the then conservative society. After marriage, she traveled around the world, meeting fellow theosophists and also forging friendships with the educator Maria Montessori, and the poet James Cousins. In 1923, she became the President of the All-India Federation of Young Theosophists, and the President of the World Federation of Young Theosophists in 1925.

In 1928, the famous Russian ballerina Anna Pavlova visited Bombay and the Arundale couple went to her performance, and later happened to travel on the same ship as her, to Australia where she was to perform next; over the course of the journey their friendship grew, and soon Rukmini Devi started learning dance from one of Anna's leading solo dancers, Cleo Nordi. It was later, at the behest of Anna, that Rukmini Devi turned her attention to discovering traditional Indian dance forms which had fallen to disrepute, and dedicated the rest of her life to their revival.

Revivalism

In 1933, at the Annual Conference of Madras Music Academy, she saw for the first time, a performance of the dance form called the Sadhir. Later she learnt the dance from Mylapore Gowri Amma and finally with the help of E Krishna Iyer from 'Pandanallur Meenakshi Sundaram Pillai'. In 1935, Rukmini Devi gave her first public performance at the 'Diamond Jubilee Convention of the Theosophical Society.

In January 1936, she along with her husband, established Kalakshetra, an academy of dance and music, built around the ancient Indian Gurukul system, at Adyar, at Chennai. Today the academy is a deemed university under the Kalakshetra Foundation and is situated in its new in  campus in Tiruvanmiyur, Chennai, where it shifted, in 1962. Amongst its noted students are Radha Burnier, Sarada Hoffman, Anjali Mehr, Kamaladevi Chattopadhyay, Sanjukta Panigrahi, C V Chandrasekhar, Yamini Krishnamurthy and Leela Samson.

Originally known as sadhir, the Indian classical dance form of Bharatanatyam owes its current name, to E Krishna Iyer and Rukmini Devi Arundale, who has been instrumental in modifying mainly the Pandanallur style of Bharatanatyam and bringing it to the global attention, and removing the extraneous sringaar and erotic elements from the dance, which were the legacy of its Devadasi association in the past. Soon she changed the very face of the dance, by introducing musical instruments, like violin, set and lighting design elements, and innovative costumes, and jewellery inspired by the temple sculptures. Just as for her teacher she approached noted gurus in various arts and classical dances, for her productions, Rukmini Devi approached noted scholars for inspiration and classical musicians and artists, for collaboration, the result was the creation some of pioneering dance dramas-based on Indian epics like the Valmiki's Ramayana and Jayadeva's Gita Govinda. Starting with famous dance dramas like, 'Sita Swayamvaram', 'Sri Rama Vanagamanam', 'Paduka Pattabhishekam' and 'Sabari Moksham', followed by 'Kutrala Kuruvanji', 'Ramayana', 'Kumara Sambhavam', 'Gita Govindam' and 'Usha Parinayam'.

Schools based on the Montessori method were first started in India, when Dr George Arundale invited Dr Maria Montessori to start courses in the 'Besant Theosophical High School' in 1939, and later also established, the 'Besant Arundale Senior Secondary School', The College of Fine Arts, The Besant Theosophical High School, The Maria Montessori School for Children, The Craft Education and Research Centre and the U V Swaminatha Iyer Library, within the Kalakshetra campus.

Later years
Rukmini Devi was nominated as a member of the Indian Parliament's Council of States (the Rajya Sabha) in April 1952 and re-nominated in 1956. She was the first Indian woman to be nominated in Rajya Sabha. Keenly interested in animal welfare, she was associated with various humanitarian organisations, and as a member of the Rajya Sabha, was instrumental for the legislation for the Prevention of Cruelty to Animals Act and for later setting up of the Animal Welfare Board of India, under her chairmanship in 1962. She remained on the board until her demise in 1986.

She did much work to promote vegetarianism in the country. She was vice-president of International Vegetarian Union for 31 years from 1955, until her death.

In 1977, Morarji Desai offered to nominate her for the post of President of India, which she turned down. In 1978, 'Kalamkari Centre' (pencraft) was set up at Kalakshetra to revitalise the ancient Indian craft of textile printing. On encouragement from Kamaladevi Chattopadhyay, she encouraged natural dyeing and weaving at Kalakshetra. She died on 24 February 1986 in Chennai.

Legacy

In January 1994, an Act of the Indian Parliament recognised the Kalakshetra Foundation as an 'Institute of National Importance'.

Year-long celebrations, including lectures, seminars and festivals marked her 100th birth anniversary, on 29 February, in 2004 at Kalakshetra and elsewhere in many parts of the world, At the campus the day was marked by special function in which old students gathered from across India and the world, in a day of songs and recitals. Also on 29 February, a photo exhibition on her life opened at the Lalit Kala Gallery in New Delhi, and on the same day, then President APJ Abdul Kalam released a photo-biography, written and compiled by Dr Sunil Kothari with a foreword by former president R Venkataraman.

In 2016, Google honored Rukmini Devi on her 112th birthday with a doodle, and later in the month marking the 80th year of the Kalakshetra Foundation held, 'Remembering Rukmini Devi’ festival of music and dance. Google also featured her in the 2017 Google Doodle for International Women's Day.

Awards and honours

 Padma Bhushan (1956)
 Sangeet Natak Akademi Award (1957)
 Desikothama (1972), Viswa Bharati University
 1967 Sangeet Natak Akademi Fellowship
 Prani Mitra (1968), Friend of All Animals, (Animal Welfare Board of India)
 Kalidas Samman (1984), Govt of Madhya Pradesh
 D. Lit. (Honoris Causa), Indira Kala Sangit Vishwavidyalaya, Khairagarh, Chhattisgarh
 Queen Victoria Silver Medal, Royal Society for the Prevention of Cruelty to Animals, London
 Addition to the roll of honour by The World Federation for the Protection of animals, The Hague
 Honorary Doctorate, Wayne State University, United States
 Scrolls of Honour, County and City of Los Angeles

See also
 Bharatanatyam
 Indian women in dance
 List of animal rights advocates

References

Further reading
 Art and culture in Indian life. Kerala University Press, Trivandrum 1975
 Sarada, S.: Kalakshetra-Rukmini Devi, reminiscences. Kala Mandir Trust, Madras 1985
India’s 50 Most Illustrious Women by Indra Gupta. Icon Publications, 2003. .
 Selections, Some selected speeches & writings of Rukmini Devi Arundale. Kalakshetra Foundation, Chennai 2003.
 Rukmini Devi Arundale: Birth Centenary Volume, edited by Shakuntala Ramani. Chennai, Kalakshetra Foundation, 2003,
 Kalakshetra Foundation (Hrsg.): Shraddanjali, brief pen portraits of a galaxy of great people who laid the foundations of Kalakshetra. Kalakshetra Foundation, Chennai 2004
 Photo Biography of Rukmini Devi, Sunil Kothari. Chennai, The Kalakshetra Foundation, 2004.
 Meduri, Avanthi (Hrsg.): Rukmini Devi Arundale (1904–1986), A Visionary Architect of Indian Culture and the Performing Arts. Motilal Banarsidass, Delhi 2005; .
Samson, Leela (2010). Rukmini Devi: A Life, Delhi: Penguin Books, India,

External links

 
 Trans-national biography of Rukmini Devi
 Rukmini Devi and Kalakshetra

1904 births
1986 deaths
20th-century Indian dancers
20th-century Indian women artists
Animal welfare and rights in India
Anti-vivisectionists
Artists from Madurai
Bharatanatyam exponents
Dancers from Tamil Nadu
Indian animal welfare workers
Indian arts administrators
Indian female classical dancers
Indian Theosophists
Indian vegetarianism activists
Nominated members of the Rajya Sabha
Performers of Indian classical dance
Recipients of the Padma Bhushan in arts
Recipients of the Sangeet Natak Akademi Award
Recipients of the Sangeet Natak Akademi Fellowship
Women artists from Tamil Nadu
Women members of the Rajya Sabha
Recipients of Kalidas Samman